The Hochschule für Musik Nürnberg (formerly Hochschule für Musik Nürnberg-Augsburg) is a music conservatoire based in Nuremberg, Bavaria, Germany. The conservatoire has a secondary building in Augsburg.

The Hochschule
The Hochschule für Musik Nürnberg is the result of the merging of the Meistersinger-Konservatorium in Nuremberg and the Leopold-Mozart-Konservatorium in Augsburg in 1998.
The Meistersinger-Konservatorium dates back from 1821 when Johannes Scharrer founded the Städtische Singschule, which later became the State Music School (1883) and from 1972 as the "Fachakademie für Musik und Meistersinger-Konservatorium".

The courses
The hochschule offers degrees and postgraduate qualifications in all orchestral instruments, jazz, popular music, singing, opera, music education, conducting and composition.

Notable alumni and faculty
This is a partial list of present and former staff and alumni.
 Werner Andreas Albert (conductor)
 Measha Brueggergosman (singer)
 Willi Domgraf-Fassbaender (singer)
 Werner Egk (composer and conductor)
 Brigitte Fassbaender (singer)
 Peter Herbolzheimer (trombonist)
 Karola Obermueller (composer)
 Claus Ogerman (composer)
 Nicolás Pasquet (conductor)
 Hilde Scheppan (soprano)
 Karl Schmitt-Walter (singer)
 Magda Schneider (actress)
 Elisabeth Scholl (soprano)
 Irmgard Seefried (singer)

References

External links 

 Official website

Education in Nuremberg
Nuremberg
Music schools in Germany
Public universities
1872 establishments in Germany